Koreshk (also known as Qoreysh and Quraish) is a village in Sedeh Rural District, Sedeh District, Qaen County, South Khorasan Province, Iran. At the 2006 census, its population was 46, in 22 families.

References 

Populated places in Qaen County